Joe's Apartment is a 1996 American musical black comedy film written and directed by John Payson (in his feature directorial debut), based on his 1992 short film of the same name, and starring Jerry O'Connell and Megan Ward. The first MTV Films production, it was the only one not to involve Paramount Pictures (the 2019 film Eli, which was distributed by Netflix, still had the involvement of Paramount).

The main focus of the story is the fact that, unbeknownst to many humans, cockroaches can talk, but prefer not to, as humans "smush first and ask questions later". They also sing and even have their own public-access television cable TV channel. Actors providing the roaches' voices included Billy West (in his feature film debut), Jim Turner, Rick Aviles (in his final film role before his death), Tim Blake Nelson, BD Wong, and Dave Chappelle. The film received generally negative reviews from critics and was a box office failure.

Plot 
Penniless and straight out of the University of Iowa, Joe (Jerry O'Connell) moves to New York needing an apartment and a job. With the fortuitous death of Mrs. Grotowski, an artist named Walter Shit (Jim Turner) helps Joe to take over the last rent controlled apartment in a building slated for demolition by convincing everyone that Mrs. Grotowski was Joe's mother. If Senator Dougherty (Robert Vaughn) can empty the building, he can make way for the prison he intends to build there, and uses thug Alberto Bianco (Don Ho) and his nephews, Vlad (Shiek Mahmud-Bey) and Jesus (Jim Sterling), to intimidate tenants.

Joe discovers he has twenty to thirty thousand roommates, all of them talking, singing cockroaches grateful that a slob has moved in. Led by Ralph (Billy West), the sentient, tune-savvy insects scare away the thugs in an act of enlightened self-interest that endears them to their human meal ticket. Tired of living on handouts from mom back in Iowa and after a series of dead-end jobs ruined by his well-intentioned six-legged roomies, Joe finds himself the unskilled drummer in Walter Shit's band. Hanging posters for SHIT, he encounters Senator Dougherty's daughter Lily (Megan Ward) promoting her own project, a community garden to occupy the vacant site surrounding Joe's building.

A gift to Lily while working on her garden is enough to woo her back to Joe's apartment. However, the cockroaches break a promise to keep out of his business and a panicked Lily flees, only to discover the garden she'd worked on has been burned to the ground. During a fight with his roommates over his spoiled romantic evening, the building suffers the same fate as the garden. A mutual truce between the hapless and now homeless roommates leads the cockroaches to "call in favors from every roach, rat and pigeon in New York City" to try to make amends to Joe. Overnight, the roaches scour New York to gather materials to convert the entire area into a garden and take care of all the necessary paperwork to ensure harmony reigns over all.

Cast 
 Jerry O'Connell as Joe (AKA Joe F. Grotowski)
 Megan Ward as Lily Dougherty
 Jim Turner as Walter Shit
 Sandra Denton as Blank
 Robert Vaughn as Senator Dougherty
 Don Ho as Alberto Bianco
 Jim Sterling as Jesus Bianco
 Shiek Mahmud-Bey as Vladimir Bianco
 David Huddleston as P.I. Smith
 Vincent Pastore as Apartment broker
 Paul Bartel as NEA scout
 Richard "Moby" Hall as Club DJ
 Graham Dewar as Pizza delivery guy 
 Nick Zedd as customer
 Solange Monnier as customer
 Desiree Casado as Girl at Play

 Cockroach voices
 Rockapella as The Roach Chorus 
 Billy West as Ralph
 Reginald Hudlin as Rodney
 Jim Turner
 BD Wong
 Jim Sterling
 Dave Chappelle
 Tim Blake Nelson
 Godfrey
 Rick Aviles
 Corey Burton
 Bam Bam Bigelow

Production 
John Payson originally created the short film Joe's Apt. in 1992, which aired on MTV as filler in-between commercial breaks. Payson said he was inspired by a 1987 short film called Those Damn Roaches and the 1987 Japanese film Twilight of the Cockroaches, the latter crossing hand-drawn animation and live action. After the short received a CableACE Award, MTV executives were impressed enough to discuss producing a feature adaptation with Payson. In 1993, MTV made a deal with Geffen Pictures during development to produce films based on the network's properties and release them through Warner Bros. While Joe's Apartment was put into production with a $13 million budget, a feature film adaptation of Beavis and Butt-Head was also put into development.

Joe's Apartment was the first feature film Blue Sky Studios was involved in, having produced company logos and animated commercials before. Under Chris Wedge's supervision, Blue Sky produced computer-animated sequences of the cockroaches. The film also blended them with scenes of puppetry, real cockroaches, and stop-motion animation (including the TV roach porn). Executives at 20th Century Fox were impressed enough with Joe's Apartment to acquire Blue Sky, and eventually the studio became a feature-animation company.

Reception 
Even with the enthusiastic billing as "MTV's first feature movie" and the support of the company, Joe's Apartment was a box office failure when it opened on July 26, 1996. Opening to 1,512 theaters but earning a dismal $1.8 million, the film closed all screenings in the middle of August and finished with only $4.6 million. Warner sold distribution rights for later MTV Film productions back to MTV's parent company, Viacom, not long after.

Reviews were almost universally negative, mostly distaste at the blending of grimy gross-out gags and up-beat musical humor. Roger Ebert gave the film one star out of four, stating "Joe's Apartment would be a very bad comedy even without the roaches, but it would not be a disgusting one. No, wait: I take that back. Even without the roaches, we would still have the subplot involving the pink disinfectant urinal cakes." Its critical consensus reads, "Audiences will want their security deposit back from Joe's Apartment, a lame comedy whose dancing cockroaches are more charming than the human characters."

References

External links 

 
 
 
 

1996 films
1990s musical comedy films
American fantasy comedy films
American films with live action and animation
American musical comedy films
American musical fantasy films
Films about insects
Fictional cockroaches
Features based on short films
The Geffen Film Company films
MTV Films films
Warner Bros. films
Films set in apartment buildings
Films set in New York City
Films shot in New York City
Films shot in New Jersey
Films scored by Carter Burwell
Films about real estate holdout
Films using stop-motion animation
1996 comedy films
1996 directorial debut films
1990s English-language films
1990s American films